The ruble sign,  is the currency sign used for the Russian ruble, the official currency of Russia. Its form is a Cyrillic letter Р with an additional horizontal stroke. The design was approved on 11 December 2013 after a public poll that took place a month earlier.  

In Russian orthography, the sign almost always follows the number (the monetary value), and in many cases there is a space between the two. In English orthography, it usually precedes the number.

History 

In the 18th and 19th centuries there was a symbol for the Russian ruble consisting of lower case Cyrillic letters — a rotated р on a у. In the 20th century р. was used to abbreviate the ruble.

The debates about adopting a national currency symbol for the Russian ruble began nearly from the start of Russia's transition to a market economy and its economic integration into the global market in the 1990s, soon after the dissolution of the Soviet Union. The idea was to reach the same level of recognition and therefore of influence as well-known currency signs such as $ (the US dollar), € (the euro), ¥ (the Chinese yuan or the Japanese yen) and £ (the Pound sterling). There were several contests to choose the ruble sign, hosted by different organizations. However, the Central Bank of Russia did not adopt one of the winning symbols from these early contests.

In 2007, a group of Russian design bureaus and studios proposed to use ₽, the stroked Cyrillic letter Р to represent the ruble. Soon after, many electronic retailers, restaurants and cafés started to use the sign unofficially. It became very popular and was widely used as a de facto standard.

In November 2013, the Central Bank of Russia finally decided to adopt a national currency sign. It placed a public poll on its website with five pre-chosen options. 

The design provided earlier by the design community that was informally yet widely used (₽) was on the poll's list and got the most votes. On 11 December 2013, ₽ was approved as the official sign for the Russian Federation's ruble.

Coding
The international three-letter code (according to International Organization for Standardization (ISO) standard ISO 4217) for the ruble is RUB.

Other uses of the symbol 
The cryptocurrency Petro, backed by government of Venezuela, uses the same symbol as the Ruble, although usually with a rounder upper part (  ). A currency symbol used in the Pokémon media franchise is visually similar to the Ruble sign but instead has two strokes (  ).

Notes

References 

Currency symbols
Economy of Russia
Symbols introduced in 2013
Currencies of Russia
Cyrillic letters with diacritics